Bhumika Gurung is an Indian actress who is best known as Namkeen "Nimki" Kumari in Nimki Mukhiya and now notably as Rani in Hara Sindoor.

Life and Family
Gurung was born on 27 January 1990. She completed her schooling from Lady Irwin school, New Delhi. She first joined Character Sketches as Senior Executive Recruiter, she also worked as a Business development Executive at Exta India Pvt. Ltd. before becoming an actress. Gurung married Shekar Malhotra on 8 March 2022 and got christened as Bhumika Gurung Malhotra.

Career
Gurung made her television debut in Channel V TV Series Gumrah: End of Innocence. In 2017, she got a chance to play a pivotal role in Nana Patekar starer film Wedding Anniversary However, Gurung rose to fame and became a household name with her titular and chirpy character of Namkeen "Nimki" Kumari in Nimki Mukhiya and Nimki Vidhayak. In 2021, she was seen playing the negative lead role of Meera in Mann Kee Awaaz Pratigya 2. Currently, she is playing the lead role of Rani in the new Hindi GEC Atrangii - Dekhte Raho channel show Hara Sindoor.

Filmography

Films

Television

Web-Series

See also 

 List of Hindi television actresses
 List of Indian television actresses

References

External links 
 

Living people
1990 births
Indian television actresses
Actresses in Hindi television
Indian soap opera actresses
21st-century Indian actresses
People from Pune
Actresses from Maharashtra